The 1969–70 season was Blackpool F.C.'s 62nd season (59th consecutive) in the Football League. They competed in the 22-team Division Two, then the second tier of English football, finishing second. As a result, they were promoted to Division One after an absence of  three seasons.

This was Les Shannon's first season as manager, after his succession of Stan Mortensen. He was installed by new chairman Bill Gregson.

Fred Pickering was the club's top scorer, with eighteen goals (seventeen in the league and one in the FA Cup).

Table

Notes

References

Blackpool F.C.
Blackpool F.C. seasons